Willem Breuker (4 November 1944 – 23 July 2010) was a Dutch bandleader, composer, arranger, saxophonist, and clarinetist.

Career
During the mid 1960s, he played with percussionist Han Bennink and pianist Misha Mengelberg, co-founding the Instant Composers Pool (ICP), with which he regularly performed until 1973. He was a member of the Globe Unity Orchestra and the Gunter Hampel Group.

In 1974, he began leading the 10-piece Willem Breuker Kollektief, which performed jazz in a theatrical and often unconventional manner, drawing elements from theater and vaudeville. With the group, he toured Western Europe, Russia, Australia, India, China, Japan, the United States, and Canada. In 1974, he founded the record label BV Haast. Beginning in 1977, he organized the annual Klap op de Vuurpijl (Top It All) festival in Amsterdam. Haast Music Publishers, which he also operated, published his scores.

In 1992, Editions de Limon published the book Willem Breuker by J. and F. Buzelin in France. Uitgeverij Walburg Pers published a Dutch translation in 1994. In 1999, BV Haast published the book Willem Breuker Kollektief: Celebrating 25 Years on the Road, which includes two albums.

In 1997, he produced  with Carrie de Swaan Componist Kurt Weill, a 48-hour, 12-part radio documentary on the life of Kurt Weill.

He died on 23 July 2010 in Amsterdam. He suffered from lung cancer and had been ill for some time.

Awards and honors
In 1998, Breuker was knighted with the Order of the Netherlands Lion.

References

External links
Willem Breuker biography
Willem Breuker Kollektief site
Willem Breuker interview
FMP releases
Obituary in Elsevier retrieved on July 29th, 2010

1944 births
2010 deaths
Musicians from Amsterdam
Avant-garde jazz musicians
Bass clarinetists
Clarinet Contrast members
Composers for carillon
Deaths from lung cancer in the Netherlands
Dutch composers
Dutch jazz bandleaders
Dutch jazz saxophonists
Globe Unity Orchestra members
ICP Orchestra members
Knights of the Order of the Netherlands Lion
Male jazz musicians
Male saxophonists
20th-century saxophonists